The coat of arms German state Thuringia 
was introduced in 1990. Like the 1949 coat of arms of Hesse it is based on the Ludovingian lion barry, also known as the "lion of Hesse", with the addition of eight mullets.

Description
The coat of arms can be blazoned Azure, a lion rampant barry of eight Gules and Argent, crowned and armed Or, surrounded by eight mullets Argent. This can be interpreted as a  blue field with a lion of eight horizontal red-and-white-stripes, with a gold crown and claws, with eight white/silver stars. Some people believe the stars represent eight historical divisions of the state.

Legal position 
It was included in the Gesetz über die Hoheitszeichen (Law on the Regional Emblems) of 30 January 1991, which came into law retrospectively to 3 October 1990. The current law, Verordnung zur Ausführung des Gesetzes über die Hoheitszeichen des Landes prescribed its use, including banning use by third parties, use of the coat of arms on the seal and use of the arms on the State flag.

History

Gallery

State of Thuringia (1920 - 1933)
The state of Thuringia was created in 1920 by uniting the seven Thuringian polities: Saxe-Weimar-Eisenach, Saxe-Meiningen, half of Saxe-Coburg and Gotha (where Saxe (Gotha) subsequently merged into Thuringia whereas Coburg merged into Bavaria), Saxe-Altenburg, Republic of Reuss (Reuss Elder Line, Reuss Younger Line), Schwarzburg-Sondershausen and Schwarzburg-Rudolstadt. The northern part of today's Thuringia was part of Prussia (Erfurt governorate) and therefore not represented in this coat of arms. Inspired by the American flag (by featuring one star for each of its counties), the shield is gules, seven mullets of six points argent - seven six-pointed stars on a red background. It was used on the state flag of that period. The coat of arms was used until 1933, when the NSDAP government created a new coat of arms.

Landgraves of Thuringia

In 1040 the Ludovingians, a dynasty from Upper Franconia (then Upper East Franconia), became the rulers of territories northern Thuringia, which at that time were part of the duchy of Saxony. Later generations of the house gained control of more of Thuringia and parts of West Franconia around Hessengau (today northern Hesse) and became counts palatine of Saxony. In 1137 they became landgraves, a position comparable to that of a duke and which was imperially immediate (i.e. they were subject only to the emperor and not to any intermediate feudal lord). In 1247 the Ludowinger line died out and they were succeeded by the Saxon House of Wettin. In 1264 the eastern parts of the landgraviate, which lay in modern Thuringia, were united with the Margraviate of Meissen following the War of the Thuringian Succession. (The western parts became the Landgraviate of Hesse. The Hessian landgraves retained the Thuringian lion barry, and its use continued through the various Hessian states to this day, where it can be found in the coat of arms of the modern state Hesse, albeit in a slightly different form than modern Thuringia's.)

The arms, used by Landgrave Conrad in the 13th century, were azure, a crowned lion rampant barry of eight argent and gules, crown and claws or.

References

See also
Coat of arms of Prussia
Coat of arms of Germany
Coat of arms of Hesse, which has a similar appearance.
Origin of the coats of arms of German federal states.

Thuringia
Thuringia
Culture of Thuringia
Thuringia
Thuringia
Thuringia
Thuringia